The 1990 All-American Bowl was an American college football bowl game that was played on December 28, 1990 at Legion Field in Birmingham, Alabama. The game matched the Southern Miss Golden Eagles against the NC State Wolfpack. It was the final contest of the 1990 NCAA Division I-A football season for both teams. The game ended in a 31–27 victory for the Wolfpack. The game represented the final game of Southern Miss quarterback Brett Favre's collegiate career. He was named the game's MVP despite his team's loss, compiling 341 passing yards in 39 attempts with one interception. The game was the fourteenth and final edition of the All-American Bowl (previously known as the Hall of Fame Classic).

Teams
The game matched the Southern Miss Golden Eagles against the NC State Wolfpack of the Atlantic Coast Conference. The game was the first bowl game featuring the Golden Eagles and the Wolfpack, and was their eighth overall meeting. Southern Miss led the series  heading into the game, and the teams' previous meeting was in 1966, when the Golden Eagles defeated the Wolfpack 7–6.

Southern Miss Golden Eagles

The conference-independent Golden Eagles entered the game ranked 23 in the AP Poll. The game represented the Golden Eagles' first appearance in the All-American Bowl.

NC State Wolfpack

The unranked NC State Wolfpack of the ACC compiled a  record before the game, including a  record against conference opponents. The game represented the Wolfpack's first appearance in the All-American Bowl.

Game summary

Scoring summary

Source:

Statistics

References

Tangerine Bowl
All-American Bowl
NC State Wolfpack football bowl games
Southern Miss Golden Eagles football bowl games
All-American Bowl
December 1990 sports events in the United States
Brett Favre